Graphium meyeri is a species of butterfly of the family Papilionidae, that is found in Sulawesi. Very little is known about this species.

Subspecies

G. m. meyeri (northern Sulawesi)
G. m. extremum Tsukada & Nishiyama, 1980 (Sula Island)

References

Butterflies described in 1874
meyeri
Butterflies of Indonesia
Taxa named by Carl Heinrich Hopffer